Sihem Amer-Yahia is an Algerian-French-American computer scientist. She is a CNRS Research Director at the Laboratoire d’Informatique de Grenoble. She leads the SLIDE research team. Sihem Amer-Yahia works on data management, declarative languages and query processing algorithms. Her publication topics include crowdsourcing, computational complexity, data analysis, data handling, data visualisation, information science, and addresses new data management problems in emerging internet and big data applications.

Early life and education 
Amer-Yahia received her Ph.D. in CS from Paris-Orsay and INRIA in 1999, and her Diplôme d’Ingénieur from INI, Algeria.

Career 
Before joining CNRS, Amer-Yahia served as a Principal Scientist at QCRI, Senior Scientist at Yahoo! Research and Member of Technical Staff at AT&T Labs.

Amer-Yahia served on several journal boards including the SIGMOD Executive Committee. She is one of the trustees emeriti of the VLDB Endowment.

Amer-Yahia also served on the EDBT (Extending Database Technology) Board, and was the program committee chair of the EDBT conference in 2014. She is the Editor-in-Chief of the VLDB Journal for Europe and Africa.

She was an associate editor of ACM TODS, her term ending in 2017, and she has been an area editor for the Information Systems Journal.

Awards and honours 
In 2020, Amer-Yahia received the CNRS Silver Medal.

In 2017, Amer-Yahia was recognised as an ACM distinguished member

References

External links
 

Year of birth missing (living people)
Living people
Algerian computer scientists
Algerian emigrants to France
Algerian women scientists
21st-century French women scientists
Yahoo! employees
AT&T people
French National Centre for Scientific Research scientists
Women computer scientists
Research directors of the French National Centre for Scientific Research